The Capt. Samuel Allison House is a historic house on New Hampshire Route 101, overlooking Howe Reservoir, in Dublin, New Hampshire.  Built about 1825 by a locally prominent mill owner, it is a good local example of Federal style residential architecture.  The house was listed on the National Register of Historic Places in 1983.

Description and history
The Captain Samuel Allison House is located on a rural stretch of New Hampshire 101 west of Dublin center, on the north side of the road a short way east of its junction with Charcoal Road.  It overlooks a portion of Howe Reservoir located south of the road, and has fine views of Mount Monadnock.  It is a -story wood-frame structure, with a side-gable roof, end chimneys, and a clapboarded exterior.  Its main facade is five bays wide, with sash windows arranged symmetrically around the main entrance.  The entrance features Federal style sidelight windows and a semi-oval transom.  A single-story hip-roof porch extends across the front, supported by square posts.

The house was built between 1825 and 1830 by Samuel Allison, a captain in the local militia and later town selectman.  Allison established a sawmill nearby in 1830, but sold it in 1848 when he moved to Marlborough.  The front porch is a later 19th-century addition. The subsequent house owners also operated the sawmill; one of them was Micah Howe, for whom the reservoir is named.  The house is stylistically similar to the Rufus Piper Homestead.

See also
National Register of Historic Places listings in Cheshire County, New Hampshire

References

Houses on the National Register of Historic Places in New Hampshire
Federal architecture in New Hampshire
Houses completed in 1825
Houses in Dublin, New Hampshire
National Register of Historic Places in Dublin, New Hampshire
1825 establishments in New Hampshire